The Inspector Lynley Mysteries is a British crime drama television series that aired on BBC One from 12 March 2001 to 1 June 2008, consisting of six series and 24 episodes. The protagonist, Detective Inspector Thomas "Tommy" Lynley, 8th Earl of Asherton (Nathaniel Parker), who is assigned to Scotland Yard, finds himself paired with Detective Sergeant Barbara Havers (Sharon Small). In addition to the tensions involved in solving murder cases, the series is built on clashes of personality, gender and class: Lynley is a polished man and a peer of the realm, and Havers is an untidy woman from a working-class background. 

In August 2007, the BBC announced its intention to stop production of The Inspector Lynley Mysteries. Fans of the series mounted a campaign to save it, with a petition and by contacting the BBC, but to no avail. All six series have since been released on DVD, distributed by Acorn Media UK.

All episodes from the first two series and two from the third are based on novels by the American writer Elizabeth George, though the plots and characters are often significantly altered. Later episodes are original stories for television based on her characters. The music for the series was composed by Robert Lockhart; later series were scored by Debbie Wiseman.

Production
The first episode (pilot), A Great Deliverance, was broadcast on 12 and 13 March 2001, becoming the only three-part episode throughout the series run. It was also based on the inaugural Inspector Lynley novel. The first full series began broadcasting on 8 April 2002, with the first episode based on and named after the third novel, Well-Schooled in Murder. The first eleven episodes were based on, and named after, the eleven Inspector Lynley novels published from 1988 to 2001, beginning with the inaugural novel A Great Deliverance, but subsequently departing from the print sequence. Nine more novels have since been published as of 2018, with a further volume due out in 2021.

Filming
Exterior shots of Lynley and Havers' base were filmed at the Bircham Dyson Bell solicitors offices on Broadway, central London. The first episode of series five was notable for being shot in Dungeness in Kent. In the first episode, Lynley drove a Peugeot 607; whereas in both series one and two he drove a Jensen Interceptor; and in later episodes a Bristol 410. Despite the frequently recurring remark in PBS Mystery! presenter Diana Rigg's introductions to the series that Lynley "is the one with the Bentley", he never drove a Bentley on TV. He does, however, drive one in the George novels. In the pilot episode, the character of Helen Clyde was played by Emma Fielding. She was later portrayed by Lesley Vickerage from series one through three (from series three she and Lynley had married and she was thus known as Helen Lynley) and by Catherine Russell in series five.

Cast
 Nathaniel Parker as Detective Inspector Thomas Lynley
 Sharon Small as Detective Sergeant Barbara Havers
 Emma Fielding as Helen Clyde (Pilot)
 Lesley Vickerage as Helen Clyde (Series 1-2) / Helen Lynley (Series 3)
 Catherine Russell as Helen Lynley (Series 5)
 Paul Hickey as Forensic Pathologist Lafferty (Series 4-6)
 Shaun Parkes as Detective Constable Winston Nkata (Series 5-6)

Episode list

Pilot (2001)

Series 1 (2002)

Series 2 (2003)

Series 3 (2004)

Series 4 (2005)

Series 5 (2006)

Series 6 (2008)
The broadcast of Limbo and Know Thine Enemy was initially postponed: they were due to air on 9 and 16 August 2007 respectively but did not air as scheduled. Their premiere broadcast came on 11 and 18 November 2007 on BBC Entertainment, before being broadcast on BBC One for the first time on 25 May and 1 June 2008 respectively.

International broadcasts
In the United States, all six series were broadcast on PBS from 2002 to 2008.

 A Great Deliverance was broadcast on the series Mystery! in two parts as Inspector Lynley I on 19 and 26 August 2002.  
 Series 1 was shown on Mystery! as Inspector Lynley II on 31 August and 7, 14, and 21 September 2003.  
 Series 2 was shown on Mystery! as Inspector Lynley III on 5, 12, 19, and 26 September 2004.
 Series 3 was shown on Mystery! as Inspector Lynley IV on 26 June and 3, 10, and 17 July 2005.  
 Series 4 was shown on Mystery! as Inspector Lynley V on 10, 17, 24 September, and 1 October 2006.  
 Series 5 was shown on Mystery! as Inspector Lynley VI on 9 and 16 September and 7 and 14 October 2007.

Episode 4 was the final broadcast of Mystery! before WGBH retooled the classic anthology series, along with Masterpiece Theatre, into Masterpiece.

 Series 6 was shown on Masterpiece Mystery! as Inspector Lynley VII on 10 and 17 August 2008.

In December 2014, Knowledge Network began broadcasting the series from the beginning in Canada.

Home Media

References

External links
 
The Inspector Lynley Mysteries at bbc.co.uk
Official Masterpiece Mystery! website for The Inspector Lynley Mysteries.
Old Official Mystery! website for The Inspector Lynley Mysteries.

Nathaniel Parker's Official Homepage covers all the latest news on the series as well as a complete collection of episode reviews
USA based Yahoo ILM Discussion Board Forum for discussion of "The Inspector Lynley Mysteries."  International membership.
UK based Yahoo group for discussion of the BBC's Inspector Lynley TV series  Photos, fan fiction, links

2001 British television series debuts
2008 British television series endings
2000s British crime television series
2000s British drama television series
BBC television dramas
BBC high definition shows
Television shows based on American novels
English-language television shows
British detective television series
British crime drama television series
2000s British mystery television series
Television shows set in London